Herbert Frierson (born July 19, 1958) is an American politician. He was a member of the Mississippi House of Representatives from the 106th District, being first elected in 1991 and resigning June 30, 2016 upon his appointment as Commissioner of the Mississippi Department of Revenue. He is a member of the Republican party.

References

1947 births
Living people
Republican Party members of the Mississippi House of Representatives
21st-century American politicians